The Essential Chieftains is a career-spanning greatest hits album by The Chieftains first released in 2006. It is part of the ongoing 'The Essential' Sony BMG compilation series, their last release for RCA ending a 20-year history since signing with the label in 1986.

Track listing

Disc 1: The Chieftains Roots 
 "Lots of Drops of Brandy" – 3:43
 "O'Sullivan's March (The Theme from Rob Roy)" – 3:59
 "An Poc Ar Buile/The Dingle Set" – 5:57
 "Carolan's Concerto" – 3:05
 "The Wind That Shakes the Barley/The Reel with the Beryle" – 2:51
 "Sea Image" – 6:11
 "Boil the Breakfast Early" – 3:55
 "The Women of Ireland (The Love Theme from Barry Lyndon)/The Morning Dew" – 5:15
 "Full of Joy" – 2:31
 "The Green Fields of America" – 5:39
 "Santiago de Cuba" – 3:39
 "The Donegal Set" – 5:46
 "Jabadaw" – 3:06
 "The Bells of Dublin/Christmas Eve" – 3:06
 "The French March" – 4:51
 "The Stone" – 6:23
 "The Munster Cloak/Tabhair Dom Do Lamh (Give Me Your Hand)"  with James Galway - 4:29
 "Chasing the Fox" (From the Ballad of the Irish Horse) – 3:26

Disc 2: The Chieftains and Friends 
 "I Know My Love" (with The Corrs) – 3:52
 "Shenandoah" (with Van Morrison) – 3:52
 "Country Blues" (with Buddy & Julie Miller) – 3:13
 "Ladies Pantalettes/Belles of Blackville/First House in Connaught (Reels)" (with Béla Fleck) – 4:14
 "The Foggy Dew" (with Sinéad O'Connor) – 5:20
 "Red Is the Rose" (with Nanci Griffith) – 3:25
 "The Squid Jiggin' Ground/Larry O'Gaff" (with The Nitty Gritty Dirt Band) – 3:16
 "Lambs In the Greenfields" (with Emmylou Harris) – 3:21
 "Guadalupe " (with Linda Ronstadt & Los Lobos) – 2:51
 "Mo Ghile Mear - Our Hero" (with Sting) – 3:20
 "Cotton-Eyed Joe" (with Ricky Skaggs) – 2:42
 "Molly Bán (Bawn)" (with Alison Krauss) – 4:45
 "Long Journey Home (Anthem)" (with Elvis Costello & Anúna) – 4:17
 "The Rocky Road To Dublin" (with The Rolling Stones) (not on all releases) – 5:03
 "Love Is Teasin'" (with Marianne Faithfull) – 4:37
 "The Rebel Jesus" (with Jackson Browne) – 3:49
 "Il Est Né/Ça Berger" (with Kate & Anna McGarrigle) – 5:19
 "Jimmy Mó Mhíle Stór" (with The Rankins) – 4:37

References

External links
 The Chieftains official website
 

2006 greatest hits albums
The Chieftains albums
RCA Victor compilation albums